United Nations Security Council Resolution 1761 was unanimously adopted on 20 June 2007.

Resolution 
The Security Council this morning extended until 31 October 2007 the mandate of the Group of Experts monitoring the ban imposed on Côte d’Ivoire concerning the trading of arms and rough diamonds.

Unanimously adopting resolution 1761 (2007) under Chapter VII of the United Nations Charter, the Council noted that the ban itself had previously been extended until the same date by resolution 1727 of December 2006.  The text of the resolution adopted today requests the Panel of Experts to report to the Council on the implementation of the trade ban before 15 October 2007.

Imposed in 2004, the sanctions are aimed at stemming the civil conflict in Côte d’Ivoire, which is divided into rebel-held northern and Government-controlled southern zones.

See also 
List of United Nations Security Council Resolutions 1701 to 1800 (2006–2008)

References

External links
Text of the Resolution at undocs.org

 1761
 1761
June 2007 events
2007 in Ivory Coast